Theodor Friedrich von Schubert (1789–1865) was a Russian general and scientist of Baltic German descent. Born in Saint Petersburg as the son of astronomer Theodor von Schubert. When he was sixteen years old, he accompanied his father on the Russian expedition to China. He was married to Sophie Rall, and had four children. He became an infantry general in the Russian army, head of the military topographic service, and honorary member of the Russian Academy of Sciences. As an officer, he fought in the War of the Fourth Coalition in 1806, in the Finnish War in 1808 and in the Russo-Turkish War in 1810. By 1812, he was an upper quartermaster general, and at the battle of Leipzig in 1813, he became a colonel. Between 1815 and 1818, he stayed with the Russian occupation force in France, before returning to Russia as part of the general staff. He was interested in cartography. In 1845, he became an infantry general. He died in Stuttgart in 1865, after having spent his last years traveling.

Bibliography
Unter dem Doppeladler, his memoirs, first published in 1962

References

Biography from Pierer's Universal-Lexikon, 4th edition 1857–1865 (in German)
Friedrich von Schubert Moon Crater

1789 births
1865 deaths
Imperial Russian Army generals
Scientists from Saint Petersburg
Russian military personnel of the Napoleonic Wars
Military personnel from Saint Petersburg